In Greek mythology, Melantho (Ancient Greek: Μελανθώ) is one of the minor characters in the Odyssey.

Family 
Melantho was the sister to Melanthios, a goatherd in Ithaca, and the daughter of Dolios.

Mythology 
Described as having a "sharp tongue", Melantho was among the favorite female slaves of Penelope, treated like a daughter by her, having been given trinkets and other small gifts. Despite having been much cared for by Penelope, Melantho was disloyal and ungrateful to Odysseus and his household. She was one of the female slaves who often sleep with the suitors of Penelope, a characteristic which is evident by her relationship with Eurymachus. 

Upon Odysseus's arrival in his own house, disguised as a beggar, Melantho treated him harshly and rudely asked why he has not gone to sleep in the smithy, the location where chance visitors in Ithaca tended to go. After Odysseus kills all of the suitors, it's not clear if Melantho is among the other slave girls that are forced to clean the hall and then hanged by Telemachus.

Notes

References 

 Homer, The Odyssey with an English Translation by A.T. Murray, PH.D. in two volumes. Cambridge, MA., Harvard University Press; London, William Heinemann, Ltd. 1919. . Online version at the Perseus Digital Library. Greek text available from the same website.
 Pausanias, Description of Greece with an English Translation by W.H.S. Jones, Litt.D., and H.A. Ormerod, M.A., in 4 Volumes. Cambridge, MA, Harvard University Press; London, William Heinemann Ltd. 1918. . Online version at the Perseus Digital Library
 Pausanias, Graeciae Descriptio. 3 vols. Leipzig, Teubner. 1903.  Greek text available at the Perseus Digital Library.

Women in Greek mythology
Characters in the Odyssey